The Emperor and the Golem is a two-part Czechoslovak historical fantasy comedy film produced in 1951. The film is set during the reign of Rudolf II, Holy Roman Emperor and was filmed in color (not common for Czechoslovak films in that period), because of the international release. It is one of the best known films of Jan Werich, who's performing a dual role of Emperor Rudolf and baker Matěj.

Plot

Part I
Aging and eccentric Emperor Rudolf II, who is obsessed with finding the Golem, refuses to hear out ambassadors and falls into destructive fits. Later he welcomes Magister Edward Kelley at Prague Castle and shows him his alchemist laboratory. All the alchemists are either charlatans or fools. Rudolf wants alchemist Scotta to make him an elixir of youth and pressures him into performing a magic ritual at night. While performing the ritual, they accidentally stumble upon the Golem. However the Golem can't be awakened without a little ball called shem.

Meanwhile, a baker Matěj is confronted with angry mob which demands bread rolls but cannot receive them, because the bread rolls are baked only for the emperor. When the corrupt head of the bakery leaves the building, Matěj distributes the emperor's bread rolls to the poor and is imprisoned in the dungeons for this deed. Kelley reveals his homunculus Sirael, whom the Emperor wishes to teach everything of our world, including love. Rudolf does not know that Sirael is a regular country girl, Kateřina, acting after coercion by Kelley. Kateřina and Matěj communicate through vents between Kelley's room and the dungeons and fall in love through conversation, although they cannot see each other. Alchemist Scotta concocts an elixir of youth for Rudolf (actually a mix of strong alcoholic drinks and morphium). Meanwhile, Matěj escapes the dungeons.

Part II
Rudolf drinks Scotta's concoction and falls asleep. Matěj ends up in the emperor's rooms. Servants of the Emperor find the fugitive Matěj, who bears a remarkable likeness to the Emperor in his young days, hiding in the bath and, believing the rejuvenation has worked, they take him for the emperor and dress him accordingly. After waking up, Rudolf sees Matěj and mistakes him for his younger self in the mirror. Elated by his supposed new vigor, Rudolf and his old loyal servant ride alone in a carriage to the countryside to remind themselves of the sins of their misspent youth.

The emperor's mistress Countess Strada also believes the rejuvenation worked and drinks up the remnants of the concoction. She embarrasses Matěj by her advances and then falls asleep. The horrified and confused Matěj puts her on top of a double-decker bed. Matěj decides that he has to act as Rudolf because it is his best chance to find Kateřina. Matěj as the emperor dismisses Rudolf's astrologer, minimises the extravagant expenses and deals with all the waiting ambassadors. He attempts to rule fairly, all the while searching for Kateřina. He finds a helper in Scotta, who knows his elixir could not have worked, and therefore knows Matěj is not the real emperor.

Meanwhile, intrigue abounds among the emperor's councillors and Kelley. They want to overthrow Rudolf and seize power for themselves. They all want to utilise the Golem and chase after the shem, which is eventually found by Matěj. Kelley then pressures Kateřina into killing the emperor, but Matěj reveals to her that he's not Rudolf. Matěj's identity is also revealed to the councillors. They all try to capture him and Kateřina, while also fighting among themselves. Kelley is killed and Matěj is captured. The Court Astrologer gets a shem from Matěj and awakens the Golem. Lang kills the astrologer and Russworm kills Lang. Then Russworm is killed by the Golem, who only obeys the person who put the shem in its head. The Emperor returns while the Golem is destroying the palace. Eventually, with the help of the townspeople, Matěj succeeds in stopping the Golem and removing the shem. Rudolf is reinstated, after Matěj convinces him to give the Golem to the people rather than use it for his own means. The Golem is installed in the bakery and its power is used to make more bread for everyone.

Cast
 Jan Werich as Emperor Rudolf II / Baker Matěj Kotrba
 Marie Vášová as Countess Catherina Strada
 Nataša Gollová as Kateřina aka Sirael
 Bohuš Záhorský as Chamberlain Filip Lang
 Jiří Plachý as Edward Kelley
 Zdeněk Štěpánek as Marshall Bernard Russworm
 František Filipovský as Court Astrologer
 František Černý as Alchemist Jeroným Alessandro Scotta
 Václav Trégl as Emperor's personal servant
 Vladimír Leraus as Hungarian Delegate
 Miloš Nedbal as Court Physician
 Bohuš Hradil as Tycho Brahe
 František Holar as Guard Commander

Production

Jan Werich and Jiří Voskovec were trying to make the film based on their play Golem in the 1930s. That film eventually became Le Golem directed by Julien Duvivier, who significantly re-wrote the screenplay and changed it into a horror film. Werich returned to this theme in 1950s and co-wrote a screenplay with Jiří Brdečka. It was originally directed by Jiří Krejčík, but after disputes with the Werich, Krejčík was replaced by Martin Frič. The whole film was shot in Barrandov Studios. It was the third Czechoslovak full-length color film after Warriors of Faith and Temno. It was shot on Eastmancolor and Agfacolor material. Costumes were based on designs by Jiří Trnka.

Release 
The Emperor and the Golem had a premiere on 4 January 1952 as a two-part film, 155 minutes long.

International version
A 112-minute-long one-part international version was prepared, with most propaganda flavoured scenes cut out (e.g., songs). It was successfully distributed in many countries, including Italy, West Germany, East Germany, Sweden, USA, UK, Finland, France, Belgium or Argentina.

References

External links 
 
 

1951 films
1950s historical comedy films
1950s fantasy comedy films
Czechoslovak comedy films
Czech historical films
Czech fantasy films
1950s Czech-language films
Films about lookalikes
Films based on fairy tales
Films directed by Martin Frič
Films with screenplays by Jiří Brdečka
Cultural depictions of Rudolf II, Holy Roman Emperor
Golem films
Films set in Prague
Films set in the 16th century
Films set in the Holy Roman Empire
Tycho Brahe
1952 comedy films
1952 films
1951 comedy films
Czech monster movies
Czech comedy films
Czechoslovak fantasy films